MaryKay Loss Carlson is an American diplomat who has served as the United States ambassador to the Philippines since 2022. She was previously the United States chargé d'affaires in Argentina from 2021 to 2022, after having served as the Deputy Chief of Mission in the country from September 2019.

Early life and education
Carlson graduated from Rhodes College in 1985 with a degree in Spanish and international studies before pursuing an M.A. in international relations from Georgetown University and M.S. in national security strategy from the National War College.

Career 

Carlson is a career member of the Foreign Service, serving since 1985. She holds the rank of Minister-Counselor. Carlson worked at the Embassy of the United States in New Delhi, India as the Deputy Chief of Mission for three years and Chargé d'affaires for two years. She has also served at U.S. Embassy in Beijing, China (twice), Embassy in Kyiv, Ukraine, Consulate General in Hong Kong, Embassy in Maputo, Mozambique, Embassy in Nairobi, Kenya, and the Embassy in Santo Domingo, Dominican Republic. She had also served as Deputy Chief of Mission at the U.S embassy in Buenos Aires, Argentina. Her domestic assignments include director of the Secretary's Executive Secretariat Staff and deputy director of Korean Affairs.

United States ambassador to the Philippines
On February 4, 2022, President Joe Biden intended to nominate Carlson to serve as US Ambassador to the Philippines. Hearings were held before the Senate Foreign Relations Committee on April 7, 2022. The committee favorably reported the nomination to the Senate floor on May 4, 2022. Carlson was confirmed by the entire Senate via voice vote on May 5, 2022. Carlson was sworn in on May 26, 2022. She presented her credentials to Philippine president Bongbong Marcos on July 22, 2022.

Awards and recognitions
Carlson has received numerous performance awards, including six Superior Honor Awards.

Personal life
Carlson is married to retired Foreign Service officer Aubrey Carlson, and they have two daughters. She is a native of Little Rock, Arkansas and speaks Spanish and Chinese.

References

External links 
 Government webpage

Year of birth missing (living people)
Living people
21st-century American diplomats
Ambassadors of the United States to Argentina
Ambassadors of the United States to India
Ambassadors of the United States to the Philippines
American women ambassadors
Georgetown University alumni
National War College alumni
Rhodes College alumni
American women diplomats